Grassroot Diplomat is a global non-profit, non-political, diplomatic consultancy established in 2013. The consultancy specialises in digital diplomacy and public diplomacy working with foreign governments and citizen diplomats to help build positive impressions of their country that serve at the level of all people, no matter what their nationality.

History
Grassroot Diplomat was founded by Talyn Rahman-Figueroa as a not-for-profit in 2011. Rahman-Figueroa used her high-level contacts and diplomatic training to create a practical consultancy that facilitated trust and better communication between governments and civil society.

Out of the ashes of the Arab Spring and London riots, Grassroot Diplomat was officially founded in 2013 to be the link between governments and civil society so that reciprocity is enhanced to better improve diplomatic actions and relations around the world. The organisation was launched at the Embassy of Bulgaria, London in 2013, hosted by Konstantin Dimitrov and Dr Jamie Shea.

Mission and objective
The name Grassroot Diplomat comes from the concept of bridging the gap between governments and civil society. Pioneered by Rahman-Figueroa,  Grassroot Diplomat strives to modernise how diplomats operate with various stakeholders, and help embassies improve their national image by breaking stereotypes and misconceptions. The organisational focus is to make diplomacy more visible in the public eye through enhanced public and digital diplomacy activities. Value-driven, the organisation believes that the focus for national interest should be on their people, their needs, and recognising their strengths and values. This means recognising countries as a body of real people, not just statistics and resources for the sake of strengthening trade and bilateral relations.

As an independent diplomatic agency, Grassroot Diplomat has no allegiance to any government in order to remain apolitical and works with all diplomatic missions, anywhere in the world.

Services
Primarily as a consultancy, Grassroot Diplomat enhances how embassies communicate both online and offline, including developing strategic communications for mission-driven embassies, as well as creating brands for Head of Missions so that they are better represented and recognised by members of civil society.

In 2018, Grassroot Diplomat published the Diplomatic Planner, a 12-month career development planner for international relations practitioners. As an extension, Grassroot Diplomat developed the 'Grassroot Diplomat Online Academy' to enable independent learning for diplomats looking to become effective leaders.

Grassroot Diplomat Initiative Award
The Grassroot Diplomat Initiative Award was established to recognise outstanding diplomats and politicians who represent the people's interest at the highest level. A total of three diplomats and three politicians are awarded in the areas of policy delivery and influence, public support on social causes, and business assistance and job creation.

In 2013, Rahman-Figueroa was the host of the inaugural Grassroot Diplomat Initiative Award. She later passed on the role to television psychologist Dr Linda Papadopoulos in 2014. Forthcoming events are held in London, Washington DC, and Brussels.

See also
Citizen diplomacy
Public diplomacy

References

External links

Diplomatic services
Non-profit organisations based in London